The Jacob Quickel House is a historic building located on the east side of Davenport, Iowa, United States. It has been listed on the National Register of Historic Places since 1984.

History
The Late Gothic Revival style residence was built in 1880. Jacob Quickel, who worked as a cutter at the Rock Island Arsenal, began living here in 1902. He is the earliest known person to reside here. C. Rollin Marks, who worked as a clerk at his family's business, the Security Fire Insurance Company, bought the house in 1907.

Architecture
This is a rare Gothic Revival style house in Davenport. The style is realized in the very steep and narrow gables. It is also found in the strongly-shaped vergeboards, porch and window details, which all give the structure a rectilinear feeling. This is typical of the Late Gothic Revival in contrast to the earlier expression of the style, which is conveyed in its use of curves. The two-story frame house was built on a rock-faced stone foundation. It features a cross-gable plan and a porch that wraps around the front and the south side.

References

Houses completed in 1880
Gothic Revival architecture in Iowa
Houses in Davenport, Iowa
Houses on the National Register of Historic Places in Iowa
National Register of Historic Places in Davenport, Iowa